Rear-Admiral John Crawford Wilson (1834 – 4 July 1885) was a Royal Navy officer who was appointed Commodore in command of the Australia Station.

Early life 
Wilson was born in 1834 to James Wilson, Chief Justice of Mauritius, and Margaret Crawford. He was the 10th of 12 children.

Naval career 
Wilson was appointed a lieutenant in the Royal Navy in 1855. Promoted to captain in 1865, he was given command of HMS Narcissus, HMS Impregnable, HMS Thunderer and HMS Wolverine. He was appointed Commodore in command of the Australia Station in 1878.

In 1879, in response to the murders of island traders, Wilson led a punitive expedition on HMS Wolverine against natives in the New Hebrides and Solomon Islands.

He was promoted to the rank of rear admiral in 1881 at the conclusion of his term in Australia.

Family 
Wilson's first marriage was to Mary Gore. He married again in 1871, this time to Georgina Emma Blackett. They had two children, Julia (b. 1872) and Alexander (b. 1876).

Death 
Wilson died on 4 July 1885. The programmed launch on 11 July of the steam gunvessel  was delayed to 27 July 1885 to allow his daughter, Julia, to conduct the ceremony.

References

External links 

 «Departure of the detached sq­ron from Port Jackson» // «The Australasian Sketcher with Pen and Pencil», Saturday 27 August 1881, p. 278
 «Queensland» // «The Sydney Morning Herald», Tuesday 13 September 1881, p. 5, «Rockhampton» // «The Morning Bulletin», Tuesday 13 September 1881, p. 2, «Rockhampton» // «The Morning Bulletin», Wednesday 14 September 1881, p. 2
 «Commodore Wilson» // «The Mercury», Saturday 17 September 1881, p. 3
 «Commodore Wilson, R.N., to His Excellency the Governor» // «The Argus», Thursday 17 November 1881, p. 9

1834 births
1885 deaths
Royal Navy admirals